William A. Wimsatt (born July 28, 1917 – died, January 9, 1985) was professor of Zoology and Chairman of the Department of Zoology at Cornell University.  From 1945 until 1960, Wimsatt taught courses in histology and embryology in the College of Arts and Sciences and also in the New York State College of Veterinary Medicine.  He was well known for his pioneering research on the interrelationships of hibernation and reproduction and the biology of bats.

Biography

Intellectual

When Wimsatt was a student at St. John's College High School in Washington, D.C., he attended a lecture by Professor Arthur "Doc" Allen (who founded the Cornell Lab of Ornithology). This triggered a strong desire in Wimsatt to study at Cornell. Due to his mother’s illness, he was unable to transfer from Catholic University in Washington to Cornell, but after her death he did. After he graduated, he became one of “Doc” Allen’s graduate students in ornithology before eventually switching to study Bats In 1943, after Wimsatt received his doctorate at Cornell under Howard Adelman, he became an instructor of anatomy at Harvard Medical School. In 1945, he returned to Cornell and was appointed assistant professor of zoology.  In 1947, he was promoted to associate professor and in 1951, he was promoted to professor of zoology; a position he held until his death.

Wimsatt made many research trips to Central and South America and the Caribbean Islands, but his most desired research trips were to the tropics of Mexico. In 1962, he spent a year working with Dr. Bernardo Villa at the University of Mexico after receiving a Guggenheim Fellowship. He spent three sabbatical leaves at the University of Arizona College of Medicine working with Dr. Philip Krutzsch, who shared similar research interests.  He was a widely acclaimed as editor of the  series Biology of Bats. His expertise was on the functional morphology of placentae. A look at his publications reveals his ability to use novel approaches in diverse areas of reproductive biology (e.g., embryology, placentation, and fetal membranes), ecological physiology, hibernation, and the integumentary, urinary, and digestive systems. This broad background served him well as an Associate Editor of The American Journal of Anatomy from 1974 until shortly before his death.

Wimsatt was a member of the Board of Trustees of Cornell University from 1960 through 1965. He served for many years as a Director of the Cornell University Research Foundation, Inc. He was a member of Sigma Xi, Phi Kappa Phi, and Phi Zeta; a Fellow of the American Association for the Advancement of Science, a member of the American Association of Anatomists, the American Society of Mammalogists, the Histochemical Society, the Society for the Study of Reproduction, and the American Society of Zoologists. He helped found the Annual North American Symposium on Bat Research and in 1981 he was awarded the Gerrit R. Miller prize “for his outstanding record of contributions to chiropteran biology.”

Personal

Wimsatt was born in Washington D. C., the son of Alma Engebretson Cheyney and William Church Wimsatt. In 1940, Wimsatt married Ruth Claire Peterson (a fellow student at Cornell). He had six children, William C. Wimsatt, Jr., Ph.D.; Michael, M.D.; John, A.A.S.; Mary, M. A.; Jeffrey, D.V.M.; and Ruth, B.S., five of which also received degrees from Cornell. He died of cancer January 9, 1985.

Selected publications

References

External links
Memorial Statement for Professor William Abell Wimsatt, Ph.D. (1917-1985)

1917 births
1985 deaths
American biologists
Cornell University faculty
Fellows of the American Association for the Advancement of Science
Cornell University alumni
20th-century biologists